Elachista pumila is a species of moth in the family Elachistidae. It was described by John S. Dugdale in 1971. This species is endemic to New Zealand, and can be found on Auckland Island.

References

Moths described in 1971
pumila
Moths of New Zealand
Fauna of the Auckland Islands
Endemic fauna of New Zealand
Endemic moths of New Zealand